The 1919 Phillips Haymakers football team represented Phillips University during the 1919 college football season. John Maulbetsch arranged a game against the Texas Longhorns in 1919, the first meeting between the schools.   When the game was announced The San Antonio Light reported: "Phillips University has one of the strongest teams in the Southwest.  The only team to beat them in the past two years is Oklahoma and last year Phillips beat the Sooners 13–7."  The report credited Maulbetsch for securing success at an institution little known in athletics before he arrived.  The University of Texas had not lost a game since 1917 when the Phillips "Haymakers" arrived in Austin, Texas on October 11, 1919.  Maulbetsch's team shocked the Longhorns, holding them scoreless and winning the contest, 10–0.  One Texas newspaper reported that Phillips had "whitewashed the Longhorns in their own corral."

Schedule

References

Phillips
Phillips Haymakers football seasons
College football undefeated seasons
Phillips Haymakers football